is the eleventh single by Japanese recording artist Aya Ueto. It was released on June 8, 2005 as the first single from Ueto's fourth studio album License.

Overview 

The title track and the B-side, "Get Fight," were written and produced by Toshihiko Takamizawa from The Alfee. "Yume no Chikara" served as theme song for the TV Asahi drama Attack No. 1, starring Ueto herself. CDJournal described "Yume no Chikara" as a "positive, relatable, and passionate song that gradually builds up emotion as it progresses."

The song was written to reflect the story of the drama's main character. At the single's release event, Ueto commented, "I sing this new song from the perspective of someone who is pursuing their dream."

Chart performance 
"Yume no Chikara" debuted on the Oricon Daily Singles chart at number 6 on June 7, 2005 and climbed to number 5 on June 11, 2005. It peaked at number 7 on the Oricon Weekly Singles chart, with 30,307 copies sold in its first week. The single charted for thirteen weeks and has sold a total of 85,095 copies.

Track listing

Charts, certifications and sales

Charts

Certifications and sales

Release history

References 

2005 singles
Aya Ueto songs
Japanese television drama theme songs
2005 songs